Azat Mousa's invasion of Georgia took place from  1302 to 1303. The invasion was initiated by group of Turkoman tribes led by Azat Mousa, it is likely that they were connected with the Chepni clan, the main nomadic tribe in the hinterland of Pontus.

History 
Around 1301 or 1302, Alexios II of Trebizond defeated a Turkoman invasion. The Turks continued their seasonal movement into the Georgian territory. When Azat-Mousa reached Tao and Basiani, he devastated them and took captives, later he moved to impassable Murghuli and Nigali valley, where his army was beaten off by the sons of noble Kherkhemeli. In about 1302, duke of Tao, Taqa Panaskerteli defeated the Turkomans at Tortomi Castle, but was unable to drive them from his lands. The Turks grew yet more furious, and devastated Tao. News of these events reached prince Beka I of Samtskhe, who summoned all his subjects and set out against the Turks.

Next year, the Turks started to return. Beka called all his subjects and gathered about 12,000 men, and set out against the Turks. The Turks entered the Parkhali Mountains, where they set up a camp, and sent 10,000 horsemen to plunder in Vashlovani. A fierce battle took place, and the Turks fled, and a great number of them were destroyed. Beka quickly advanced towards Speri and Bayburd. They captured the town, except for the fortress. When it became impossible to stand Beka's siege, they sent him an envoy and agreed to pay tribute.

References 

14th century in the Kingdom of Georgia
14th-century conflicts
Invasions of Georgia (country)
Wars involving Georgia (country)
1302
1303